Crasna or Kraszna is a commune in Sălaj County, Crișana, Romania. It lies 14 km northwest of Zalău and 11 km southeast of Șimleu Silvaniei, on the river Crasna.  It is composed of four villages: Crasna, Huseni (Krasznahosszúaszó), Marin (Máron) and Ratin (Ráton).

History
Its name originates from the Slavic word krasna, meaning "beautiful".  The village was first mentioned in 1213, as Karasna. It had a castle which was still inhabited in the 17th century. It was the county seat of the historical Kraszna county of the Kingdom of Hungary until 1876. Later it belonged to the Kraszna district of Szilágy County until the Treaty of Trianon, which gave it to Romania.

Population 
 In 1910 it had 3884 residents, with a significant Hungarian majority (3790 people). In 2002, the commune had 6373 inhabitants: 63.8% Hungarians, 28% Romanians and 8.1% Roma. 53.1% were Reformed, 30% Romanian Orthodox, 9.4% Baptist, 2.1% each Seventh-day Adventist and Greek-Catholic and 1.7% Roman Catholic.
 In 2002 it had 6,373 inhabitants .
 In 2012 it had 6,485 residents, with a significant Hungarian majority (4103 people).

Sights to see
 Reformed church, built in the late 14th century; with 4 spires and a painted sunken panel ceiling which was made in the 17th century.
 Reformed Church in Ratin
 Orthodox Church in Crasna
 Greek Catholic Church in Marin
 Lake Vârșolț

Image gallery

References

This article is based on a translation of the equivalent article from the Hungarian Wikipedia on 22 February 2007.

Communes in Sălaj County
Localities in Crișana